Kazakh Sign Language (KSL) or Kazakh–Russian Sign Language (KRSL) is a dialect of Russian Sign Language used in Kazakhstan. It is influenced by the Kazakh language.

See also 

 Kazakh language
 Russian Sign Language

References 

Sign languages
sign language